U2 are an Irish rock band from Dublin, formed in 1976. The group consists of Bono (lead vocals and rhythm guitar), the Edge (lead guitar, keyboards, and backing vocals), Adam Clayton (bass guitar), and Larry Mullen Jr. (drums and percussion). Initially rooted in post-punk, U2's musical style has evolved throughout their career, yet has maintained an anthemic quality built on Bono's expressive vocals and the Edge's chiming, effects-based guitar sounds. Bono's lyrics, often embellished with spiritual imagery, focus on personal and sociopolitical themes. Popular for their live performances, the group have staged several ambitious and elaborate tours over their career.

The band was formed when the members were teenaged pupils of Mount Temple Comprehensive School and had limited musical proficiency. Within four years, they signed with Island Records and released their debut album, Boy (1980). Works such as their first UK number-one album, War (1983), and the singles "Sunday Bloody Sunday" and "Pride (In the Name of Love)" helped establish U2's reputation as a politically and socially conscious group. By the mid-1980s, they had become renowned globally for their live act, highlighted by their performance at Live Aid in 1985. U2's fifth album, The Joshua Tree (1987), made them international stars and was their greatest critical and commercial success. Topping music charts around the world, it produced their only number-one singles in the US to date: "With or Without You" and "I Still Haven't Found What I'm Looking For".

Facing creative stagnation and a backlash to their documentary/double album, Rattle and Hum (1988), U2 reinvented themselves in the 1990s. Beginning with their acclaimed seventh album, Achtung Baby (1991), and the multimedia-intensive Zoo TV Tour, the band pursued a new musical direction influenced by alternative rock, electronic dance music, and industrial music, and they embraced a more ironic, flippant image. This experimentation continued through their ninth album, Pop (1997), and the PopMart Tour, which were mixed successes. U2 regained critical and commercial favour with the records All That You Can't Leave Behind (2000) and How to Dismantle an Atomic Bomb (2004), which established a more conventional, mainstream sound for the group. Their U2 360° Tour of 2009–2011 set records for the highest-attended and highest-grossing concert tour, both of which were surpassed in 2019. The group most recently released the companion albums Songs of Innocence (2014) and Songs of Experience (2017), the former of which received criticism for its pervasive, no-cost release through the iTunes Store.

U2 have released 15 studio albums and are one of the world's best-selling music artists, having sold an estimated 150–170 million records worldwide. They have won 22 Grammy Awards, more than any other band, and in 2005, they were inducted into the Rock and Roll Hall of Fame in their first year of eligibility. Rolling Stone ranked U2 at number 22 on its list of the "100 Greatest Artists of All Time". Throughout their career, as a band and as individuals, they have campaigned for human rights and social justice causes, including Amnesty International, Jubilee 2000, the ONE/DATA campaigns, Product Red, War Child, and Music Rising.

History

Formation and early years (1976–1980) 

In 1976, Larry Mullen Jr., then a 14-year-old pupil of Mount Temple Comprehensive School in Dublin, Ireland, posted a note on the school's notice board in search of musicians for a new band. At least five people responded and attended the first practice, which was held on 25 September in Mullen's kitchen. Mullen played drums and was joined by: Paul Hewson ("Bono") on lead vocals; David Evans ("the Edge") and his older brother Dik Evans on guitar; Adam Clayton, a friend of the Evans brothers, on bass guitar; and Ivan McCormick. Mullen later described it as "'The Larry Mullen Band' for about ten minutes, then Bono walked in and blew any chance I had of being in charge." Peter Martin, a friend of Mullen and McCormick, loaned his guitar and amplifier for the first practice, but he could not play and was quickly phased out; sources differ on whether he was in attendance at the first meeting or not. McCormick was dropped from the group after a few weeks. The remaining five members settled on the name "Feedback" for the group because it was one of the few technical terms they knew. Early rehearsals took place in their music teacher's classroom at Mount Temple. Most of their initial material consisted of cover songs, which they admitted was not their forte. Emerging punk rock acts such as the Stranglers, the Jam, the Clash, Buzzcocks, and Sex Pistols were strong influences on the group. The popularity of punk convinced them that musical proficiency was not a prerequisite to success.

In April 1977, Feedback played their first gig for a paying audience at St. Fintan's High School. Shortly thereafter, the band changed their name to "The Hype". Dik Evans, who was older and by that time attending college, was becoming the odd man out. The rest of the band was leaning towards the idea of a four-piece ensemble. In March 1978, the group changed their name to "U2". Steve Averill, a punk rock musician (with the Radiators) and family friend of Clayton's, had suggested six potential names from which the band chose U2 for its ambiguity and open-ended interpretations, and because it was the name that they disliked the least. That same month, U2, as a four-piece, won a talent contest in Limerick sponsored by Harp Lager and the Evening Press. The prize consisted of £500 and a recording session for a demo that would be heard by record label CBS Ireland. The win was an important milestone and affirmation for the fledgling act. Within a few days, Dik Evans was officially phased out of the band with a farewell concert at the Presbyterian Church Hall in Howth. During the show, which featured the group playing cover songs as the Hype, Dik ceremonially walked offstage. The remaining four band members returned later in the concert to play original material as U2. Dik joined another band, the Virgin Prunes, which comprised mutual friends of U2's; the Prunes were their default opening act early on, and the two groups often shared members for live performances to cover for occasional absences. As part of their contest prize, U2 recorded their first demo tape at Keystone Studios in Dublin in April 1978, but the results were largely unsuccessful due to their inexperience.

Irish magazine Hot Press was influential in shaping U2's future; in addition to being one of their earliest allies, the publication's journalist Bill Graham introduced the band to Paul McGuinness, who agreed to be their manager in mid-1978. With the connections he was making within the music industry, McGuinness booked demo sessions for the group and sought to garner them a record deal. The band continued to build their fanbase with performances across Ireland, the most famous of which were a series of weekend afternoon shows at Dublin's Dandelion Market in the summer of 1979. In August, U2 recorded demos at Windmill Lane Studios with CBS talent scout Chas de Whalley as producer, marking the first of the band's many recordings at the studio during their career. The following month, three songs from the session were released by CBS as the Ireland-only EP Three. It was the group's first chart success, selling all 1,000 copies of its limited edition 12-inch vinyl almost immediately. In December 1979, the band performed in London for their first shows outside Ireland, although they were unable to gain much attention from audiences or critics. On 26 February 1980, their second single, "Another Day", was released on the CBS label, but again only for the Irish market. The same day, U2 played a show at the 2,000-seat National Stadium in Dublin as part of an Irish tour. Despite their gamble of booking a concert in such a large venue, the move paid off. Bill Stewart, an A&R representative for Island Records, was in attendance and offered to sign them to the label. The following month, the band signed a four-year, four-album contract with Island, which included a £50,000 advance and £50,000 in tour support.

Boy and October (1980–1982) 

In May 1980, U2 released "11 O'Clock Tick Tock", their first international single and their debut on Island, but it failed to chart. Martin Hannett, who produced the single, was slated to produce the band's debut album, Boy, but ultimately was replaced with Steve Lillywhite. From July to September 1980, U2 recorded the album at Windmill Lane Studios, drawing from their nearly 40-song repertoire at the time. Lillywhite suggested recording Mullen's drums in a stairwell, and recording smashed bottles and forks played against a spinning bicycle wheel. The band found Lillywhite to be very encouraging and creative; Bono called him "such a breath of fresh air", while the Edge said he "had a great way of pulling the best out of everybody". The album's lead single, "A Day Without Me", was released in August. Although it did not chart, the song was the impetus for the Edge's purchase of a delay effect unit, the Electro-Harmonix Memory Man, which came to define his guitar playing style and had a significant impact on the group's creative output.

Released in October 1980, Boy received generally positive reviews. Paul Morley of NME called it "touching, precocious, full of archaic and modernist conviction", while Declan Lynch of Hot Press said he found it "almost impossible to react negatively to U2's music". Bono's lyrics reflected on adolescence, innocence, and the passage into adulthood, themes represented on the album cover through the photo of a young boy's face. Boy peaked at number 52 in the United Kingdom and number 63 in the United States. The album included the band's first songs to receive airplay on US radio, including the single "I Will Follow", which reached number 20 on the Top Tracks rock chart. Boys release was followed by the Boy Tour, U2's first tour of continental Europe and the US. Despite being unpolished, these early live performances demonstrated the band's potential, as critics complimented their ambition and Bono's exuberance.

The band faced several challenges in writing their second album, October. On an otherwise successful American leg of the Boy Tour, Bono's briefcase containing in-progress lyrics and musical ideas was lost backstage during a March 1981 performance at a nightclub in Portland, Oregon. The band had limited time to write new music on tour and in July began a two-month recording session at Windmill Lane Studios largely unprepared, forcing Bono to quickly improvise lyrics. Lillywhite, reprising his role as producer, called the sessions "completely chaotic and mad". Octobers lead single, "Fire", was released in July and was U2's first song to chart in the UK. Despite garnering the band an appearance on UK television programme Top of the Pops, the single fell in the charts afterwards. On 16 August 1981, the group opened for Thin Lizzy at the inaugural Slane Concert, but the Edge called it "one of the worst shows [U2] ever played in [their] lives". Adding to this period of self-doubt, Bono's, the Edge's, and Mullen's involvement in a Charismatic Christian group in Dublin called the "Shalom Fellowship" led them to question the relationship between their religious faith and the lifestyle of a rock band. Bono and the Edge considered quitting U2 due to their perceived spiritual conflicts before deciding to leave Shalom instead.

October was released in October 1981 and contained overtly spiritual themes. The album received mixed reviews and limited radio play, and although it debuted at number 11 in the UK, it sold poorly elsewhere. The single "Gloria" was U2's first song to have its music video played on MTV, generating excitement for the band during the October Tour of 1981–1982 in markets where the television channel was available. During the tour, U2 met Dutch photographer Anton Corbijn, who became their principal photographer and has had a major influence on their vision and public image. In March 1982, the band played 14 dates as the opening act for the J. Geils Band, increasing their exposure. Still, U2 were disappointed by their lack of progress by the end of the October Tour. Having run out of money and feeling unsupported by their record label, the group committed to improving; Clayton recalled that "there was a firm resolve to come out of the box fighting with the next record".

War and Under a Blood Red Sky (1982–1983)
After the October Tour, U2 decamped to a rented cottage in Howth, where they lived, wrote new songs, and rehearsed for their third album, War. Significant musical breakthroughs were achieved by the Edge in August 1982 during a two-week period of independent songwriting, while the other band members vacationed and Bono honeymooned with his wife, Ali. From September to November, the group recorded War at Windmill Lane Studios. Lillywhite, who had a policy of not working with an artist more than twice, was convinced by the group to return as their producer for a third time. The recording sessions featured contributions from violinist Steve Wickham and the female singers of Kid Creole and the Coconuts. For the first time, Mullen agreed to play drums to a click track to keep time. After completing the album, U2 undertook a short tour of Western Europe in December.

Wars lead single, "New Year's Day", was released in January 1983. It reached number 10 in the UK and became the group's first hit outside of Europe; in the US, it received extensive radio coverage and peaked at number 53. Resolving their doubts of the October period, U2 released War in February. Critically, the album received favourable reviews, although a few UK reviewers were critical of it. Nonetheless, it was the band's first commercial success, debuting at number one in the UK, while reaching number 12 in the US. Wars sincerity and "rugged" guitar were intentionally at odds with the trendier synthpop of the time. Described as a record on which the band "turned pacifism itself into a crusade", War was lyrically more political than their first two records, focusing on the physical and emotional effects of warfare. The album included the protest song "Sunday Bloody Sunday", in which Bono lyrically tried to contrast the events of the 1972 Bloody Sunday shooting with Easter Sunday. Other songs from the record addressed topics such as nuclear proliferation ("Seconds") and the Polish Solidarity movement ("New Year's Day"). War was U2's first record to feature Corbijn's photography. The album cover depicted the same young child who had appeared on the cover of their debut album, albeit with his previously innocent expression replaced by a fearful one.

On the subsequent 1983 War Tour of Europe, the US and Japan, the band began to play progressively larger venues, moving from clubs to halls to arenas. Bono attempted to engage the growing audiences with theatrical, often dangerous antics, climbing scaffoldings and lighting rigs and jumping into the audience. The sight of Bono waving a white flag during performances of "Sunday Bloody Sunday" became the tour's iconic image. The band played several dates at large European and American music festivals, including a performance at the US Festival on Memorial Day weekend for an audience of 125,000 people. Nearly rained out, the group's 5 June 1983 concert at Red Rocks Amphitheatre was singled out by Rolling Stone as one of "50 Moments that Changed the History of Rock and Roll". The show was recorded for the concert video Live at Red Rocks, and was one of several concerts from the tour captured on their live album Under a Blood Red Sky. The releases received extensive play on MTV and the radio, expanding the band's audience and showcasing their prowess as a live act. During the tour, the group established a new tradition by closing concerts with the War track "40", during which the Edge and Clayton would switch instruments and the band members would leave the stage one-by-one as the crowd continued to sing the refrain "How long to sing this song?". The War Tour was U2's first profitable tour, grossing about US$2 million.

The Unforgettable Fire and Live Aid (1984–1985) 
With their record deal with Island Records coming to an end, U2 signed a more lucrative extension in 1984. They negotiated the return of the copyrights of their songs, an increase in their royalty rate, and a general improvement in terms, at the expense of a larger initial payment.

U2 feared that following the overt rock of the War album and tour, they were in danger of becoming another "shrill", "sloganeering arena-rock band". They were confident that fans would embrace them as successors to groups like the Who and Led Zeppelin, but according to Bono: "something just didn't feel right. We felt we had more dimension than just the next big anything, we had something unique to offer." Thus, they sought experimentation for their fourth studio album, The Unforgettable Fire. Clayton said, "We were looking for something that was a bit more serious, more arty." The Edge admired the ambient and "weird works" of Brian Eno, who, along with his engineer Daniel Lanois, eventually agreed to produce the record. Their hiring contravened the initial recommendation of Island Records founder Chris Blackwell, who believed that just when the band were about to achieve the highest levels of success, Eno would "bury them under a layer of avant-garde nonsense".

Partly recorded in Slane Castle, The Unforgettable Fire was released in October 1984 and was at the time the band's most marked change in direction. It was ambient and abstract, and featured a rich, orchestrated sound. Under Lanois' direction, Mullen's drumming became looser, funkier, and more subtle, and Clayton's bass became more subliminal. Complementing the album's atmospheric sound, the lyrics were left open to interpretation, providing what the band called a "very visual feel". Due to a tight recording schedule, Bono felt songs like "Bad" and "Pride (In the Name of Love)" were incomplete "sketches". The album reached number one in the UK, and was successful in the US. The lead single "Pride (In the Name of Love)", written about civil rights movement leader Martin Luther King Jr., was the band's biggest hit to that point and was their first song to chart in the US top 40.

Much of the Unforgettable Fire Tour moved into indoor arenas as U2 began to win their long battle to build their audience. The complex textures of the new studio-recorded tracks, such as "The Unforgettable Fire" and "Bad", posed a challenge in translating to live performances. One solution was programming music sequencers, which the band had previously been reluctant to use but now incorporate into the majority of their performances. Songs on the album had been criticised as being "unfinished", "fuzzy", and "unfocused", but were better received by critics when played on stage. Rolling Stone, which was critical of the album version of "Bad", described its live performance as a "show stopper".

In March 1985, a Rolling Stone cover story called U2 the "Band of the '80s", saying that "for a growing number of rock-and-roll fans, U2 have become the band that matters most, maybe even the only band that matters". On 13 July 1985, the group performed at the Live Aid concert at Wembley Stadium for Ethiopian famine relief, before a crowd of 72,000 fans and a worldwide television audience of 1.5 billion people. During a 12-minute performance of "Bad", Bono climbed down from the stage to embrace and dance with a female fan he had picked out of the crowd, showing a television audience the personal connection that he could make with fans. The performance was regarded as a pivotal event in the band's career; The Guardian cited Live Aid as the moment that made stars of U2, and it included their performance on a list of 50 key events in rock history.

The Joshua Tree and Rattle and Hum (1986–1990) 

For their fifth album, The Joshua Tree, the band wanted to build on The Unforgettable Fires textures, but instead of out-of-focus experimentation, they sought a harder-hitting sound within the limitation of conventional song structures. Realising that "U2 had no tradition" and that their knowledge of music from before their childhood was limited, the group delved into American and Irish roots music. Friendships with Bob Dylan, Van Morrison, and Keith Richards motivated Bono to explore blues, folk, and gospel music and to focus on his skills as a songwriter and lyricist. U2 halted the album sessions in June 1986 to serve as a headline act on the Conspiracy of Hope benefit concert tour for Amnesty International. Rather than distract the band, the tour invigourated their new material. The following month, Bono travelled to Nicaragua and El Salvador and saw first-hand the distress of peasants affected by political conflicts and US military intervention. The experience became a central influence on their new music.

The Joshua Tree was released in March 1987. The album juxtaposes antipathy towards US foreign policy against the group's deep fascination with the country, its open spaces, freedom, and ideals. The band wanted music with a sense of location and a "cinematic" quality, and the record's music and lyrics draw on imagery created by American writers whose works the band had been reading. The Joshua Tree was critically acclaimed; Robert Hilburn of the Los Angeles Times said the album "confirms on record what this band has been slowly asserting for three years now on stage: U2 is what the Rolling Stones ceased being years ago—the greatest rock and roll band in the world". The record went to number one in over 20 countries, including the UK where it received a platinum certification in 48 hours and sold 235,000 copies in its first week, making it the fastest seller in British chart history at the time. In the US, it spent nine consecutive weeks at number one. The album included the hit singles "With or Without You", "I Still Haven't Found What I'm Looking For", and "Where the Streets Have No Name", the first two of which became the group's only number-one hits in the US. U2 became the fourth rock band to be featured on the cover of Time magazine, which called them "Rock's Hottest Ticket". The album and its songs received four Grammy Award nominations, winning for Album of the Year and Best Rock Performance by a Duo or Group with Vocal. Many publications, including Rolling Stone, have cited The Joshua Tree as one of rock's greatest albums. The Joshua Tree Tour was the first tour on which the band played shows in stadiums alongside smaller arena shows. It grossed US$40 million and drew 3 million attendees.

In October 1988, the group released Rattle and Hum, a double album and theatrically released documentary film that captured the band's experiences with American roots music on the Joshua Tree Tour. The record featured nine studio tracks and six live U2 performances, including recordings at Sun Studio in Memphis and collaborations with Dylan and B.B. King. Intended as a tribute to American music, the project received mixed reviews from both film and music critics; one Rolling Stone editor spoke of the album's "excitement", another described it as "misguided and bombastic". The film's director, Phil Joanou, described it as "an overly pretentious look at U2". The film underperformed at the box office and was pulled from theatres after three weeks, having grossed only $8.6 million. Despite the criticism, the album sold 14 million copies and reached number one worldwide. Lead single "Desire" became the band's first number-one song in the UK while reaching number three in the US. Most of the album's new material was played on 1989–1990's Lovetown Tour, which only visited Australasia, Japan, and Europe. In addition, they had grown dissatisfied with their live performances; Mullen recalled, "We were the biggest, but we weren't the best". With a sense of musical stagnation, Bono hinted at changes to come during a 30 December 1989 concert near the end of the tour; before a hometown crowd in Dublin, he said on stage that it was "the end of something for U2" and that they had to "go away and ... just dream it all up again".

Achtung Baby, Zoo TV, and Zooropa (1990–1993) 

Stung by the criticism of Rattle and Hum, the band sought to transform themselves musically. Seeking inspiration from German reunification, they began work on their seventh studio album, Achtung Baby, at Berlin's Hansa Studios in October 1990 with producers Daniel Lanois and Brian Eno. The sessions were fraught with conflict, as the band argued over their musical direction and the quality of their material. While Clayton and Mullen preferred a sound similar to U2's previous work, Bono and the Edge were inspired by European industrial music and electronic dance music and advocated a change. Weeks of tension and slow progress nearly prompted the group to break up until they made a breakthrough with the improvised writing of the song "One". They returned to Dublin in 1991, where morale improved and the majority of the album was completed.

Achtung Baby was released in November 1991. The album represented a calculated change in musical and thematic direction for the group; the shift was one of their most dramatic since The Unforgettable Fire. Sonically, the record incorporated influences from alternative rock, dance, and industrial music of the time, and Bono referred to its musical departure as "four men chopping down the Joshua Tree". Thematically, it was a more introspective and personal record; it was darker, yet at times more flippant than the band's previous work. Commercially and critically, it has been one of the band's most successful albums. It produced five hit singles, including "The Fly", "Mysterious Ways", and "One", and it was a crucial part of the band's early 1990s reinvention. In 1993, Achtung Baby won the Grammy Award for Best Rock Performance by a Duo or Group with Vocal. Like The Joshua Tree, many publications have cited the record as one of rock's greatest.

Like Achtung Baby, the 1992–1993 Zoo TV Tour was an unequivocal break with the band's past. In contrast to the austere stage setups of previous U2 tours, Zoo TV was an elaborate multimedia event. It satirised the pervasive nature of television and its blurring of news, entertainment, and home shopping by attempting to instill "sensory overload" in its audience. The stage featured large video screens that showed visual effects, random video clips from pop culture, and flashing text phrases, along with a lighting system partially made of Trabant automobiles. Whereas U2 were known for their earnest performances in the 1980s, the group's Zoo TV performances were intentionally ironic and self-deprecating. On stage, Bono performed as several over-the-top characters, including the leather-clad egomaniac "The Fly", the greedy televangelist "Mirror Ball Man", and the devilish "MacPhisto". Prank phone calls were made to US President George H. W. Bush, the United Nations, and others. Live satellite link-ups to war-torn Sarajevo caused controversy. Zoo TV was the highest-grossing North American tour of 1992, earning US$67 million.

In June 1993, U2 signed a long-term, six-album deal to remain with Island Records/PolyGram. The Los Angeles Times estimated that the deal was worth US$60 million to the band, making them the highest-paid rock group ever. The following month, the group released a new album, Zooropa. Quickly recorded during a break in the Zoo TV Tour in early 1993, it expanded on many of the themes from Achtung Baby and the tour. Initially intended to be an EP, Zooropa ultimately evolved into a full-length LP album. It was an even greater musical departure for the group, delving further into electronic, industrial, and dance music. Country musician Johnny Cash sang the lead vocals on the closing track "The Wanderer". Most of the songs were played at least once during the 1993 legs of the tour, which visited Europe, Australia, New Zealand, and Japan; half the album's tracks became permanent fixtures in the setlist. Although the commercially successful Zooropa won the Grammy Award for Best Alternative Music Album in 1994, the band regard it with mixed feelings, as they felt it was more of "an interlude".

Clayton's issues with alcohol came to a head on the final leg of the Zoo TV Tour. After experiencing a blackout, Clayton was unable to perform for the group's 26 November 1993 show in Sydney, which served as the dress rehearsal for a worldwide television broadcast the following night. Bass guitar technician Stuart Morgan filled in for him, marking the first time a member of U2 had missed a concert since their earliest days. After the incident, Clayton resolved to quit drinking alcohol. The tour concluded the following month in Japan. Overall, it tallied 5.3 million in ticket sales and US$151 million in gross revenues. Qs Tom Doyle said in 2002 that Zoo TV was "the most spectacular rock tour staged by any band".

Passengers, Pop, and PopMart (1994–1998) 
In 1995, following a long break, U2 contributed "Hold Me, Thrill Me, Kiss Me, Kill Me" to the soundtrack album of the film Batman Forever. The song was a hit, reaching number one in Australia and Ireland, number two in the UK, and number 16 in the US. In November, the band released an experimental album called Original Soundtracks 1, a collaboration with Brian Eno, who contributed as a full songwriting partner and performer. Due to his participation and the record's highly experimental nature, the band chose to release it under the moniker "Passengers" to distinguish it from U2's conventional albums. Mullen said of the release: "There's a thin line between interesting music and self-indulgence. We crossed it on the Passengers record." It was commercially unnoticed by U2 standards and it received generally mixed reviews. The single "Miss Sarajevo" (featuring Luciano Pavarotti) was among Bono's favourite U2 songs.

U2 began work on their next studio album, Pop, in mid-1995, holding recording sessions with Nellee Hooper, Flood, and Howie B. The band mixed the contrasting influences of each producer into their music, in particular Howie B's experiences with electronica and dance music. Mullen was sidelined due to back surgery in November, prompting the other band members to take different approaches to songwriting, such as programming drum loops and playing to samples provided by Howie B. Upon Mullen's return in February 1996, the group began re-working much of their material but struggled to complete songs, causing them to miss their mid-year deadline to complete the record. Further complicating matters, the band allowed manager Paul McGuinness to book their 1997–1998 PopMart Tour with the album still in progress; Bono called it "the worst decision U2 ever made". Rushed to complete the album, the band delayed its release date a second time from the 1996 holiday season to March 1997, cutting into tour rehearsal time. Even with the additional recording time, U2 worked up to the last minute to complete songs.

In February 1997, the group released Pops lead single, "Discothèque", a dance-heavy song with a music video in which the band wore Village People costumes. The song reached number one in the UK, Japan, and Canada, but did not chart for long in the US despite debuting at number 10. Within days of the single's release, the group announced the PopMart Tour with a press conference in the lingerie section of a Kmart department store. Tickets went on sale shortly after, but Pop would not be released until March. The album represented U2's further exploration of nightclub culture, featuring heavy, funky dance rhythms. The record drew favourable reviews. Rolling Stone stated that U2 had "defied the odds and made some of the greatest music of their lives". Other critics, though, felt that the album was a major disappointment. Despite debuting at number one in over 30 countries, Pop dropped off the charts quickly. Bono admitted that the album "didn't communicate the way it was intended to", while the Edge called it a "compromise project by the end".

The PopMart Tour commenced in April 1997 and was intended as a satire of consumerism. The stage included a 100-foot-tall (30 m) golden yellow arch reminiscent of the McDonald's logo, a 40-foot-tall (12 m) mirrorball lemon, and a 150-foot-long (46 m) LED video screen, at the time the world's largest. U2's "big shtick" failed to satisfy many who were seemingly confused by the band's new kitsch image and the tour's elaborate set. The reduced rehearsal time for the tour affected the quality of early shows, and in some US markets, the band played to half-empty stadiums. On several occasions, the mirrorball lemon from which the band emerged for the encores malfunctioned, trapping them inside. Despite the mixed reviews and difficulties of the tour, Bono considered PopMart to be "better than Zoo TV aesthetically, and as an art project it is a clearer thought." He later explained, "When that show worked, it was mindblowing."

The European leg of the tour featured two highlights. The group's 20 September 1997 show in Reggio Emilia was attended by over 150,000 people, which was reported to have set a world record for the largest paying audience for a one-act show. U2 also performed in Sarajevo on 23 September, making them the first major group to stage a concert there following the Bosnian War. Mullen described the show as "an experience I will never forget for the rest of my life, and if I had to spend 20 years in the band just to play that show, and have done that, I think it would have been worthwhile." Bono called the show "one of the toughest and one of the sweetest nights of my life". The tour concluded in March 1998 with gross revenues of US$173.6 million and 3.98 million tickets sold. The following month, U2 appeared on the 200th episode of the animated sitcom The Simpsons, in which Homer Simpson disrupts the band on stage during a PopMart concert. In November 1998, U2 released their first compilation album, The Best of 1980–1990, which featured a re-recording of a 1987 B-side, "Sweetest Thing", as its single. The album broke a first-week sales record in the US for a greatest hits collection by a group, while "Sweetest Thing" topped the singles charts in Ireland and Canada.

All That You Can't Leave Behind and Elevation Tour (1998–2002) 
Following the mixed success of their musical pursuits in the 1990s, U2 sought to simplify their sound; the Edge said that with Pop, the group had "taken the deconstruction of the rock 'n' roll band format to its absolute 'nth degree". For their tenth album, All That You Can't Leave Behind, the group wanted to return to their old recording ethos of "the band in a room playing together". Reuniting with Eno and Lanois, U2 began working on the album in late 1998. After their experiences with being pressured to complete Pop, the band were content to work without deadlines. With Bono's schedule limited by his commitments to debt relief for Jubilee 2000 and the other band members spending time with their families, the recording sessions stretched through August 2000.

Released in October of that year, All That You Can't Leave Behind was seen by critics as a "back to basics" album, on which the group returned to a more mainstream, conventional rock sound. For many of those not won over by the band's forays into dance music, it was considered a return to grace; Rolling Stone called it U2's "third masterpiece" alongside The Joshua Tree and Achtung Baby. The album debuted at number one in 32 countries and sold 12 million copies. Its lead single, "Beautiful Day", was a worldwide hit, reaching number one in Ireland, the UK, Australia, and Canada, while peaking at number 21 in the US. The song won Grammy Awards for Best Rock Performance by a Duo or Group with Vocal, Song of the Year, and Record of the Year. At the awards ceremony, Bono declared that U2 were "reapplying for the job ... [of] the best band in the world". The album's other singles were worldwide hits as well; "Stuck in a Moment You Can't Get Out Of", "Elevation", and "Walk On" reached number one in Canada, while charting in the top five in the UK and top ten in Australia.

The band's 2001 Elevation Tour commenced in March, visiting North America and Europe across three legs. For the tour, U2 performed on a scaled-down stage, returning to arenas after nearly a decade of stadium productions. Mirroring the album's themes of "emotional contact, connection, and communication", the tour's set was designed to afford the group greater proximity to their fans; a heart-shaped catwalk around the stage encircled many audience members, and festival seating was offered in the US for the first time in the group's history. During the tour, U2 headlined a pair of Slane Concerts in Ireland, playing to crowds of 80,000. Following the September 11 attacks in the US, All That You Can't Leave Behind found added resonance with American audiences, as the album climbed in the charts and songs such as "Walk On" and "Peace on Earth" garnered radio airplay. In October, U2 performed at Madison Square Garden in New York City for the first time since the attacks. Bono and the Edge said these shows were among their most memorable and emotional performances. The Elevation Tour was the top-earning North American tour of 2001 with a gross of US$109.7 million, the second-most ever at the time for a North American tour. Globally, it grossed US$143.5 million from 2.18 million tickets sold, making it the year's highest-grossing tour overall. Spin named U2 the "Band of the Year" for 2001, saying they had "schooled bands half their age about what a rock show could really accomplish".

On 3 February 2002, U2 performed during the Super Bowl XXXVI halftime show. In a tribute to those who died in the September 11 attacks, the victims' names were projected onto a backdrop, and at the end, Bono opened his jacket to reveal an American flag in the lining. Sports Illustrated, Rolling Stone, and USA Today ranked the band's performance as the best halftime show in Super Bowl history. Later that month, U2 received four additional Grammy Awards; All That You Can't Leave Behind won Best Rock Album, while "Walk On" was named Record of the Year, marking the first time an artist had won the latter award in consecutive years for songs from the same album. In November 2002, the band released their second compilation, The Best of 1990–2000, which featured several remixed 1990s songs and two new tracks, including the single "Electrical Storm".

How to Dismantle an Atomic Bomb and Vertigo Tour (2003–2006) 
Looking for a harder-hitting rock sound than that of All That You Can't Leave Behind, U2 began recording their eleventh studio album, How to Dismantle an Atomic Bomb, in February 2003 with producer Chris Thomas. After nine months of work, the band had an album's worth of material ready for release, but they were not satisfied with the results; Mullen said that the songs "had no magic". The group subsequently enlisted Steve Lillywhite to take over as producer in Dublin in January 2004. Lillywhite, along with his assistant Jacknife Lee, spent six months with the band reworking songs and encouraging better performances. Several other producers received credits on the album, including Lanois, Eno, Flood, Carl Glanville, and Nellee Hooper; Bono acknowledged that the involvement of multiple producers affected the record's "sonic cohesion".

Released in November 2004, How to Dismantle an Atomic Bomb received favourable reviews from critics. The album featured lyrics touching on life, death, love, war, faith, and family. It reached number one in 30 countries, including the US, where first-week sales of 840,000 copies nearly doubled those of All That You Can't Leave Behind, setting a personal best for the band. Overall, it sold 9 million copies globally. For the album's release, U2 partnered with Apple for several cross-promotions: the first single, "Vertigo", was featured in a television advertisement for the company's iPod music player, while a U2-branded iPod and digital box set exclusive to the iTunes Store were released. "Vertigo" was an international hit, topping the charts in Ireland and the UK, while reaching number two in Canada and number five in Australia. The song won three Grammy Awards, including one for Best Rock Song. Other singles from the album were also hits; "Sometimes You Can't Make It on Your Own", written as a tribute to Bono's late father, went to number one in the UK and Canada, while "City of Blinding Lights" reached number two in both regions. In March 2005, U2 were inducted into the Rock and Roll Hall of Fame by Bruce Springsteen in their first year of eligibility. During his speech, Springsteen said the band had "beaten [the odds] by continuing to do their finest work and remaining at the top of their game and the charts for 25 years".

U2's 2005–2006 Vertigo Tour was preceded by several complications. A sudden illness afflicting the Edge's daughter nearly resulted in the tour's cancellation, before the group decided to adjust the tour schedule to accommodate her treatment. Additionally, ticket presales on the band's website were plagued with issues, as subscribing members encountered technical glitches and limited ticket availability, partially due to scalpers exploiting the system. Commencing in March 2005, the Vertigo Tour consisted of arena shows in North America and stadium shows internationally across five legs. The indoor stage replaced the heart-shaped ramp of the Elevation Tour with an elliptical one and featured retractable video curtains around the stage, while the stadium stage used a massive LED video screen. Setlists on tour varied more than in the group's past and included songs they had not played in decades. Like its predecessor, the Vertigo Tour was a commercial success, ranking as the top-earning tour of 2005 with US$260 million grossed.

In February 2006, U2 received five additional Grammy Awards, including Song of the Year for "Sometimes You Can't Make It on Your Own", and Best Rock Album and Album of the Year for How to Dismantle an Atomic Bomb; the awards made the album and its singles winners in all eight categories in which U2 were nominated, spanning two separate Grammy ceremonies. The group resumed the Vertigo Tour that month with a Latin American leg, on which several shows were filmed for the concert film U2 3D. It was released in theatres nearly two years later, and was the world's first live-action digital 3D film. In March, the band postponed the tour's remaining shows until the end of the year due to the health of the Edge's daughter. On 25 September 2006, U2 and Green Day performed at the Louisiana Superdome prior to an NFL football game, the New Orleans Saints' first home game in the city since Hurricane Katrina. The two bands covered the Skids' song "The Saints Are Coming" during the performance and for a benefit single, which reached number one in Australia and throughout Europe. U2 issued an official autobiography, U2 by U2, that month, followed in November by their third compilation album, U218 Singles. The Vertigo Tour concluded in December, having sold 4.6 million tickets and having earned US$389 million, the second-highest gross ever at the time.

In August 2006, the band incorporated its publishing business in the Netherlands following the capping of Irish artists' tax exemption at €250,000. The Edge stated that businesses often seek to minimise their tax burdens. The move was criticised in the Irish parliament. The band defended themselves, saying approximately 95% of their business took place outside Ireland, that they were taxed globally because of this, and that they were all "personal investors and employers in the country". Bono later said, "I think U2's tax business is our own business and I think it is not just to the letter of the law but to the spirit of the law."

No Line on the Horizon and U2 360° Tour (2006–2011) 
Recording for U2's twelfth album, No Line on the Horizon, began with producer Rick Rubin in 2006, but the sessions were short-lived and the material was shelved. In May 2007, the group began new sessions with Brian Eno and Daniel Lanois in Fez, Morocco, involving the producers as full songwriting partners. Intending to write "future hymns"—songs that would be played forever—the group spent two weeks recording in a riad and exploring local music. The Edge called it "a very freeing experience" that "reminded [him] in many ways of early on and why [they] got into a band in the first place. Just that joy of playing." As recording on the album continued in New York, London, and Dublin, the band scaled back their experimental pursuits, which Eno said "sounded kind of synthetic" and were not easily married with the group's sound.

No Line on the Horizon was released in February 2009, more than four years after How to Dismantle an Atomic Bomb, marking the longest gap between albums of the band's career to that point. It received generally positive reviews, including their first five-star Rolling Stone review, but critics found it was not as experimental as originally billed. The album debuted at number one in over 30 countries, but its sales of 5 million were seen as a disappointment by U2 standards and it did not contain a hit single. Following the album's release, the band discussed tentative plans for a follow-up record entitled Songs of Ascent. Bono described the project as "a more meditative album on the theme of pilgrimage".

The group embarked on the U2 360° Tour in June 2009. It was their first live venture for Live Nation under a 12-year, US$100 million (£50 million) contract signed the year prior. As part of the deal, the company assumed control over U2's touring, merchandising, and official website. The 360° Tour concerts featured the band playing stadiums "in the round" on a circular stage, allowing the audience to surround them on all sides. To accommodate the stage configuration, a large four-legged structure nicknamed "The Claw" was built above the stage, with the sound system and a cylindrical, expanding video screen on top of it. The tour visited Europe and North America in 2009. On 25 October 2009, U2 set a new US record for single concert attendance for one headline act, performing to 97,014 people at the Rose Bowl in Pasadena. In May 2010, while rehearsing for the next leg of the tour, Bono suffered a herniated disk and severe compression of the sciatic nerve, requiring emergency back surgery. The band were forced to postpone the North American leg of the tour and a headlining performance at the Glastonbury Festival 2010 until the following year. After Bono's recovery, U2 resumed the 360° Tour in August 2010 with legs in Europe, Australia, and New Zealand, during which they began to play new, unreleased songs live. By its conclusion in July 2011, U2 360° had set records for the highest-grossing concert tour (US$736 million) and most tickets sold for a tour (7.3 million).

Songs of Innocence and Innocence + Experience Tour (2011–2015) 

Throughout the 360° Tour, the band worked on multiple projects, including: a traditional rock album produced by Danger Mouse; a dance record produced by RedOne and will.i.am; and Songs of Ascent. However, the latter was not completed to their satisfaction, and by December 2011, Clayton admitted it would not come to fruition. The sessions with Danger Mouse instead formed the foundation of U2's next album, and they worked with him until May 2013 before enlisting the help of producers Paul Epworth, Ryan Tedder, Declan Gaffney, and Flood. The band suspended work on the album late in 2013 to contribute a new song, "Ordinary Love", to the film Mandela: Long Walk to Freedom. The track, written in honour of Nelson Mandela, won the 2014 Golden Globe Award for Best Original Song. In November 2013, U2's long-time manager Paul McGuinness stepped down from his post as part of a deal with Live Nation to acquire his management firm, Principle Management. McGuinness, who had managed the group for over 30 years, was succeeded by Guy Oseary. In February 2014, another new U2 song, the single "Invisible", debuted in a Super Bowl television advertisement and was made available in the iTunes Store at no cost to launch a partnership with Product Red and Bank of America to fight AIDS. Bono called the track a "sneak preview" of their pending record.

On 9 September 2014, U2 appeared at an Apple product launch event to make a surprise announcement of their thirteenth studio album, Songs of Innocence. They released it digitally the same day to all iTunes Store customers at no cost, making it available to over 500 million people in what Apple CEO Tim Cook called "the largest album release of all time". Apple reportedly paid Universal Music Group and U2 a lump sum for a five-week exclusivity period in which to distribute the album and spent US$100 million on a promotional campaign. Songs of Innocence recalls the group members' youth in Ireland, touching on childhood experiences, loves and losses, while paying tribute to their musical inspirations. Bono described it as "the most personal album we've written". The record received mixed reviews and drew criticism for its digital release strategy; it was automatically added to users' iTunes accounts, which for many, triggered an unprompted download to their electronic devices. Chris Richards of The Washington Post called the release "rock-and-roll as dystopian junk mail". The group's press tour for the album was interrupted after Bono was seriously injured in a bicycle accident in Central Park on 16 November 2014. He suffered fractures of his shoulder blade, humerus, orbit, and pinky finger, leading to uncertainty that he would ever be able to play guitar again.

Following Bono's recuperation, U2 embarked on the Innocence + Experience Tour in May 2015, visiting arenas in North America and Europe from May through December. The group structured their concerts around a loose autobiographical narrative of "innocence" passing into "experience", with a fixed set of songs for the first half of each show and a varying second half, separated by an intermission—a first for U2 concerts. The stage spanned the length of the venue floor and comprised three sections: a rectangular main stage, a smaller circular B-stage, and a connecting walkway. The centerpiece of the set was a  double-sided video screen that featured an interior catwalk, allowing the band members to perform amidst the video projections. U2's sound system was moved to the venue ceilings and arranged in an oval array, in hopes of improving acoustics by evenly distributing sound throughout the arena. In total, the tour grossed US$152.2 million from 1.29 million tickets sold. The final date of the tour, one of two Paris shows rescheduled due to the 13 November 2015 attacks in the city, was filmed for the video Innocence + Experience: Live in Paris and broadcast on the American television network HBO.

The Joshua Tree anniversary tours and Songs of Experience (2016–2019)
In 2016, U2 worked on their next studio album, Songs of Experience, which was intended to be a companion piece to Songs of Innocence. The group had mostly completed the album by year's end and planned to release it in the fourth quarter, but after the shift of global politics in a conservative direction, highlighted by the UK's Brexit referendum and the 2016 US presidential election, they chose to put the record on hold and reassess its tone. The group spent the extra time rewriting lyrics, rearranging and remixing songs, and pursuing different production styles. Further impacting the lyrical direction of the album was a "brush with mortality" that Bono experienced; in December 2016, he underwent open-heart surgery due to an aortic aneurysm that formed over time as a result of having a bicuspid aortic valve.

U2 toured in 2017 to commemorate the 30th anniversary of The Joshua Tree, with each show featuring a performance of the entire album. It was the first time the group toured in promotion of an album from their back catalogue, rather than a new release. The Edge cited the same world events that caused the group to delay Songs of Experience for what he judged to be renewed resonance of The Joshua Trees subject matter and a reason to revisit it. The tour's stage featured a 7.6K video screen measuring  that was, according to The Guardian, the largest and highest resolution screen used on a concert tour. The tour included a headlining appearance at the Bonnaroo Music Festival in June. The tour grossed more than $316 million from over 2.7 million tickets sold, making it the highest-grossing tour of the year.

Songs of Experience was released on 1 December 2017. Lyrically, the album reflects the "political and personal apocalypse" that Bono felt had occurred in his life in 2016. The first single, "You're the Best Thing About Me", is one of several songs from the record for which Bono wrote the lyrics as letters addressed to people and places closest to his heart. Songs of Experience received generally mixed reviews from critics, though it was the sixth-best-selling album globally in 2017 with 1.3 million copies sold. In 2018, the group embarked on the Experience + Innocence Tour, beginning in Tulsa, Oklahoma, on 2 May 2018. It grossed $126.2 million from 924,000 tickets sold, according to Billboard.

U2's Joshua Tree anniversary concert tour visited Oceania and Asia in 2019, marking the band's first performances in Australia and New Zealand since the 360° Tour in 2010, and their first ever performances in South Korea, Singapore, India, and the Philippines. The band released a new single, "Ahimsa", with Indian musician A.R. Rahman to promote their December concert in India. The group's 2019 shows grossed $73.8 million and sold 567,000 tickets, bringing the cumulative totals for their Joshua Tree anniversary tours to $390.8 million grossed and 3.3 million tickets sold.

Songs of Surrender and concerts at MSG Sphere at The Venetian (2020–current)
In October 2022, several media outlets reported that U2 were in discussions to sign with Irving and Jeffrey Azoff of Full Stop Management, following the end of Guy Oseary's nine-year tenure as the band's manager.

In January 2023, U2 announced the album Songs of Surrender, which comprises 40 re-recorded and reinterpreted songs from the group's back catalogue. It was released on 17 March 2023. 

During a Super Bowl LVII television advertisement, it was announced that U2 would perform a limited concert engagement to open MSG Sphere at The Venetian in the Las Vegas Valley in autumn 2023. The series of shows, named "U2:UV Achtung Baby Live at the Sphere", will be focused on the group's 1991 album Achtung Baby. Mullen, however, will not participate in the concerts due to a planned surgery and period of recuperation, marking the first time since 1978 that U2 will perform without him; Dutch drummer Bram van den Berg from the band Krezip will fill in.

Musical style 

Bono's songwriting exhibits a penchant for social, political, and personal subject matter, while maintaining a grandiosity. In addition, the Edge has described U2 as a fundamentally live band. U2's early sound was punk-influenced alternative rock, and the group were associated with the post-punk movement. Their influences included acts such as Television, Siouxsie and the Banshees, and Joy Division, and their resulting sound was described as containing a "sense of exhilaration" that resulted from the Edge's "radiant chords" and Bono's "ardent vocals". However, according to Bob Stanley, "U2 rejected post-punk's own rejection of pop as lingua franca, its hunkering down in regional particularity, and its raised finger to populist communication." U2 developed a melodic sound under the early influence of record producer Steve Lillywhite at a time when they were not known for musical proficiency. Their songs began as minimalistic and uncomplicated instrumentals heard on Boy and October, before evolving with War to include aspects of rock anthem, funk, and dance rhythms to become more versatile and aggressive. Boy and War were labelled "muscular and assertive" by Rolling Stone, influenced in large part by Lillywhite's producing. The Unforgettable Fire, which began with the Edge playing more keyboards than guitars, as well as follow-up The Joshua Tree, had Brian Eno and Daniel Lanois at the production helm. With their influence, both albums achieved a "diverse texture". The songs from The Joshua Tree and Rattle and Hum placed more emphasis on Lanois-inspired rhythm as they mixed distinct and varied styles of gospel and blues music, which stemmed from the band's burgeoning fascination with America's culture, people and places.

In the 1990s, U2 reinvented themselves as they began using synthesisers, distortion, and electronic beats derived from noise music, dance, and hip-hop on Achtung Baby, Zooropa, and Pop. According to Stephen Thomas Erlewine, "U2 was able to sustain their popularity in the '90s by reinventing themselves as a post-modern, self-consciously ironic dance-inflected pop-rock act, owing equally to the experimentalism of late '70s Bowie and '90s electronic dance and techno". They have also been called a pop-rock band by biographer Michael Heatley and musicologist Gerry Smyth. The band's 1990s output has been regarded as an art rock phase in commentaries by biographer John Jobling, Salon journalist Nico Lang, and music critic Jim DeRogatis, as well as in an interview by Bono. Time magazine's Josh Tyrangiel went further in saying that, "In the towering period that spanned The Joshua Tree to Zooropa, U2 made stadium-size art rock with huge melodies that allowed Bono to throw his arms around the world while bending its ear about social justice."

In the 2000s, U2 returned to more stripped-down rock and pop sounds, with more conventional rhythms and reduced usage of synthesisers and effects, "reinvent[ing] themselves as a quality pop band", according to music journalist Chris Charlesworth. U2's music has been regarded as pop in analyses by writers David Hawke, Robert Christgau, and Niall Stokes. In an interview with Stokes for Hot Press, Bono explained the band's struggles in the 1980s among high-brow circles who patronized them for being a successful pop group, leading to their embrace of the term "pop" by the 1990s. Reviewing their 2000 album All That You Can't Leave Behind, Christgau remarked that, "since they'd been calling themselves pop for half of their two-decade run, maybe they'd better sit down and write some catchy songs. So they did." Summing up U2's stylistic evolution since Boy, Guitar journalist Owen Bailey said that they "have gone on to conquer the world's airwaves and arenas in a number of different incarnations, ranging from earnest, politically charged new-wave flagbearers to wide-eyed art-rock musicologists to purveyors of irony-laden alt-rock and ever onward", with the Edge remaining "at the heart of their sound".

Vocals

Bono is known for his impassioned vocal style, often delivered in a high register through open-throated belting. Bono has been classified as a tenor, and according to him has a three-octave vocal range; one analysis found it to span from C to G on studio recordings over the course of his career. He frequently employs "whoa-oh-oh" vocalisations in his singing. Rock musician Billie Joe Armstrong of Green Day said: "He's a physical singer, like the leader of a gospel choir, and he gets lost in the melodic moment. He goes to a place outside himself, especially in front of an audience, when he hits those high notes." He added that Bono is "not afraid to go beyond what he's capable of".

In the early days of U2, Bono unintentionally developed an English vocal accent as a result of him mimicking his musical influences such as Siouxsie and the Banshees.  "I still think that I sing like Siouxsie from The Banshees on the first two U2 albums. But I found my voice through Joey Ramone at that gig in Dublin. I stood there and heard him singing. He sang a bit like a girl too. It was all going to be OK after all. That was my way in." His vocal style evolved during the band's exploration of roots music for The Joshua Tree; Spin said that he learned to  command "the full whisper-to-shout range of blues mannerisms". Bono attributed this maturation to "loosening up", "discover[ing] other voices", and employing more restraint in his singing. For "Where the Streets Have No Name", Bono varied the timbre of his voice extensively and used rubato to vary its timing, while author Susan Fast found "With or Without You" to be the first track on which he "extended his vocal range downward in an appreciable way".

Bono continued to explore a lower range in the 1990s, using what Fast described as "breathy and subdued colors" for Achtung Baby. One technique used on the album is octave doubling, in which his vocals are sung in two different octaves, either simultaneously or alternating between verses and choruses. According to Fast, this technique introduces "a contrasting lyrical idea and vocal character to deliver it", leading to both literal and ironic interpretations of Bono's vocals. On tracks such as "Zoo Station" and "The Fly", his vocals were highly processed, giving them a different emotional feel from his previous work. Bono said that lowering his voice helped him find a new vocal vocabulary, which he felt was limited to "certain words and tones" by his tenor voice. His singing on Zooropa was an even further departure from U2's previous style; throughout the record, Bono "underplay[ed] his lung power", according to Jon Pareles, and he also used an operatic falsetto he calls the "Fat Lady" voice on the tracks "Lemon" and "Numb".

Guitar 

The Edge's style of playing guitar is distinguished by his chiming timbres, echoing notes, sparse voicings, and extensive use of effects units. He favours the perfect fifth interval and often plays chords consisting of just two notes, the fifth and the root note, while eliminating the third. This style is not explicitly in a minor or major key, but implies both, creating a musical ambiguity. For these chords, he often plays the same notes on multiple strings, some of which are left open, creating an Irish-influenced drone. Against this drone, he changes other notes to imply a harmony. Among the Edge's signature techniques are playing arpeggios, sixteenth note percussive strumming, and harmonics, the latter of which he described as "so pure and finely-focused that [they have] the incredible ability to pierce through [their] environment of sound, just like lightning". His approach to guitar playing is relatively understated and eschews virtuosity in favour of "atmospherics, subtlety, minimalism, and clever signal processing". Rather than emulate common playing styles, the Edge is interested in "tearing up the rule book" and finding new ways to approach the instrument. He cited guitarists such as Tom Verlaine of Television, John McGeoch, Rory Gallagher, and Patti Smith as some of his strongest influences.

The Edge's guitar sound is frequently modulated with a delay set to a dotted eighth note for rhythmic effect. After acquiring his first delay pedal, the Electro-Harmonix Memory Man, he became fascinated with how to use its return echo to "fill in notes that [he's] not playing, like two guitar players rather than one". The effect unit became a mainstay in his guitar rig and had a significant impact on the band's creative output. The Edge became known for his extensive use of effects units, and for his meticulous nature in crafting specific sounds and guitar tones from his equipment choices. Led Zeppelin guitarist Jimmy Page called him a "sonic architect", while Neil McCormick described him as an "effects maestro". Critics have variously referred to the Edge's guitar sounds as evoking the image of fighter planes on "Bullet the Blue Sky", resembling a "dentist's drill" on "Love Is Blindness", and resembling an "airplane turbine" on "Mofo". The Edge said that rather than using effects merely to modify his sound, he uses them to spark ideas during his songwriting process.

The Edge developed his playing style during his teenage years, partially as a result of him and Mullen trying to accommodate the "eccentric" bass playing of Clayton by being the timekeepers of the band. In their early days, the Edge's only guitar was his 1976 Gibson Explorer Limited Edition, which became a signature of the group. However, he found the sound of the Explorer's bass strings unsatisfactory and avoided them in his playing early on, resulting in a trebly sound. He said by focusing "on one area of the fretboard [he] was developing a very stylized way of doing something that someone else would play in a normal way". Other equipment choices contribute to the Edge's unique sound. His 1964 Vox AC30 "Top Boost" amplifier (housed in a 1970s cabinet) is favoured for its "sparkle" tone, and is the basis for his sound both in the studio and live. Rather than hold his plectrum with a standard grip, the Edge turns it sideways or upside down to use the dimpled edge against the strings, producing a "rasping top end" to his tone.

Rhythm section
As a rhythm section, Mullen and Clayton often play the same patterns, giving U2's music a driving, pulsating beat that serves as a foundation for the Edge's guitar work. For his drumming, Mullen locks into the Edge's guitar playing, while Clayton locks his bass playing into Mullen's drumming. Author Bill Flanagan said that their playing styles perfectly reflected their personalities: "Larry is right on top of the beat, a bit ahead—as you'd expect from a man who's so ordered and punctual in his life. Adam plays a little behind the beat, waiting till the last moment to slip in, which fits Adam's casual, don't-sweat-it personality."

Mullen's drumming style is influenced by his experience in marching bands during his adolescence, which helped contribute to the militaristic beats of songs such as "Sunday Bloody Sunday". Flanagan said that he plays "with a martial rigidity but uses his kit in a way a properly trained drummer would not"; he tends to transition from the snare drum onto tom-toms positioned on either side of him, contrasting with how they are traditionally used. Mullen occasionally rides a tom-tom the way other drummers would play a cymbal, or rides the hi-hat how others would play a snare. He admitted his bass drum technique is not a strength, as he mostly played the snare in marching bands and did not learn to properly combine the separate drumming elements together on a full kit. As a result, he uses a floor tom to his left to create the effect of a bass drum. He said, "I couldn't do what most people would consider a normal beat for the song, so I chose alternatives." He was heavily influenced by glam rock acts of the 1970s when first learning to play drums. In the early days of U2, Mullen had what Bono called a "florid" drumming style, before he eventually adopted a philosophy of simplicity and pared down his rhythms. His drumming leaves open space, owing to what Modern Drummer described as his understanding of "when to hit and when not to hit". As he matured as a timekeeper, he developed a preternatural sense of rhythm; Eno recounted one occasion when Mullen noticed that his click track had been set incorrectly by just six milliseconds. Under the tutelage of Lanois, Mullen learned more about his musical role as the drummer in filling out the band's sound, while Flood helped Mullen learn to play along with electronic elements such as drum machines and samples. His kit has a tambourine mounted on a cymbal stand, which he uses as an accent on certain beats for songs such as "With or Without You".

Clayton's style of bass guitar playing is noted for what instructor Patrick Pfeiffer called "harmonic syncopation". With this technique, Clayton plays a consistent rhythm that stresses the eighth note of each bar, but he "anticipates the harmony by shifting the tonality" before the guitar chords do. This gives the music a feeling of "forward motion". In the band's early years, Clayton had no formal musical training, and he generally played simple bass parts in  time consisting of steady eighth notes emphasising the roots of chords. Over time, he incorporated influences from Motown and reggae into his playing style, and as he became a better timekeeper, his playing became more melodic. Flanagan said that he "often plays with the swollen, vibrating bottom sound of a Jamaican dub bassist, covering the most sonic space with the smallest number of notes". Clayton relies on his own instincts when developing basslines, deciding whether to follow the chord progressions of the guitars or play a counter-melody, and when to play an octave higher or lower. He cites bassists such as Paul Simonon, Bruce Foxton, Peter Hook, Jean-Jacques Burnel, and James Jamerson as major influences on him. Describing his role in the rhythm section, Clayton's said, "Larry's drums have always told me what to play, and then the chords tell me where to go".

Lyrics and themes 

U2's lyrics are known for their social and political themes, and are often embellished with Christian and spiritual imagery. Songs such as "Sunday Bloody Sunday", "Silver and Gold", and "Mothers of the Disappeared" were motivated by current events of the time. The first was written about the Troubles in Northern Ireland, while the last was a tribute to COMADRES, the women whose children were killed or forcibly disappeared at the hands of the Salvadoran government during the country's civil war. The song "Running to Stand Still" from The Joshua Tree was inspired by the heroin addiction that was sweeping through Dublin—the lyric "I see seven towers, but I only see one way out" references the Ballymun Towers of Dublin's Northside and the imagery throughout the song personifies the struggles of addiction.

Bono's personal conflicts and turmoil inspired songs like "Mofo", "Tomorrow" and "Kite". An emotional yearning or pleading frequently appears as a lyrical theme, in tracks such as "Yahweh", "Peace on Earth", and "Please". Much of U2's songwriting and music is also motivated by contemplations of loss and anguish, coupled with hopefulness and resilience, themes that are central to The Joshua Tree. Some of these lyrical ideas have been amplified by Bono and the band's personal experiences during their youth in Ireland, as well as Bono's campaigning and activism later in his life. U2 have used tours such as Zoo TV and PopMart to caricature social trends, such as media overload and consumerism, respectively.

While the band and its fans often affirm the political nature of their music, U2's lyrics and music have been criticised as apolitical because of their vagueness and "fuzzy imagery", and a lack of any specific references to actual people or characters.

Influences 

The band cites the Who, the Clash, Television, Ramones, the Beatles, Joy Division, Siouxsie and the Banshees, Elvis Presley, Patti Smith, and Kraftwerk as influences. In addition, Van Morrison has been cited by Bono as an influence, and the Rock and Roll Hall of Fame mentioned his influence on U2. U2 have also worked with and/or had influential relationships with artists including Johnny Cash, Green Day, Leonard Cohen, Bruce Springsteen, B.B. King, Lou Reed, Bob Dylan, and Luciano Pavarotti. Bono said that David Bowie helped him discover the works of Bertolt Brecht, William Burroughs, Springsteen, and Brian Eno.

Activism and philanthropy 

Since the early 1980s, the members of U2—as a band and individually—have collaborated with other musicians, artists, celebrities, and politicians to address issues concerning poverty, disease, and social injustice.

In 1984, Bono and Clayton participated in Band Aid to raise money for the 1983–85 famine in Ethiopia. This initiative produced the hit charity single "Do They Know It's Christmas?", which would be the first of several collaborations between U2 and Bob Geldof. In July 1985, U2 performed at Live Aid, a follow-up to Band Aid's efforts. Bono and his wife Ali, invited by World Vision, visited Ethiopia that year where they witnessed the famine first-hand. Bono later said that this laid the groundwork for his Africa campaigning and some of his songwriting. In 1986, U2 participated in the Self Aid benefit concert for unemployment in Ireland and the Conspiracy of Hope benefit concert tour in support of Amnesty International. The same year, Bono and Ali also visited Nicaragua and El Salvador at the invitation of the Sanctuary movement and saw the effects of the Salvadoran Civil War. These 1986 events greatly influenced The Joshua Tree album, which was being recorded at the time.

During their Zoo TV Tour in 1992, U2 participated in the "Stop Sellafield" concert with Greenpeace to protest a nuclear fuel reprocessing plant. Events in Sarajevo during the Bosnian War inspired the song "Miss Sarajevo", which premiered at a September 1995 Pavarotti and Friends show, and which Bono and the Edge performed at War Child. U2 fulfilled a 1993 promise to play in Sarajevo during the PopMart Tour in 1997. The following year, they performed in Belfast days prior to the vote on the Good Friday Agreement, bringing Northern Irish political leaders David Trimble and John Hume on stage to promote the agreement. Later that year, all proceeds from the release of the "Sweetest Thing" single went towards supporting the Chernobyl Children's Project.

The band dedicated their 2000 song "Walk On" to Burma's pro-democracy leader Aung San Suu Kyi, who had been under house arrest since 1989. In late 2003, Bono and the Edge participated in the South Africa HIV/AIDS awareness 46664 series of concerts hosted by Nelson Mandela. In 2005, the band played the Live 8 concert in London, which Geldof helped stage on the 20th anniversary of Live Aid to support the Make Poverty History campaign. The band and manager Paul McGuinness were awarded Amnesty International's Ambassador of Conscience Award for their work in promoting human rights.

Since 2000, Bono's campaigning has included Jubilee 2000 with Geldof, Muhammad Ali, and others to promote the cancellation of third-world debt during the Great Jubilee. In January 2002, Bono co-founded the multinational NGO DATA, with the aim of improving the social, political, and financial state of Africa. He continued his campaigns for debt and HIV/AIDS relief into June 2002 by making high-profile visits to Africa. Product Red, a for-profit licensed brand seeking to raise money for the Global Fund, was co-founded by Bono in 2006. The ONE Campaign, originally the US counterpart of Make Poverty History, was shaped by his efforts and vision.

In November 2005, the Edge and producer Bob Ezrin helped introduce Music Rising, an initiative to replace instruments for musicians in the New Orleans area impacted by Hurricane Katrina and Hurricane Rita. In 2006, U2 collaborated with pop punk band Green Day to record a remake of the song "The Saints Are Coming" by the Skids to benefit Music Rising. A live version of the song recorded at the Louisiana Superdome was released on the single.

At the 3rd iHeartRadio Music Awards in April 2016, U2 were honored with the Innovator Award for their "impact on popular culture and commitment to social causes." In April 2020, the group donated €10 million to purchase personal protective equipment for Irish healthcare workers working during the COVID-19 pandemic. The band also donated US$1.5 million to ease the impact of the pandemic on the music industry, including a €200,000 donation to the Songs from an Empty Room fundraiser.

Bono has received a number of awards for his music and activism, including the Legion of Honour from the French Government in 2003, Times Person of the Year for 2005 (along with Bill Gates and Melinda Gates), and an honorary British knighthood in 2007.  Some news sources have questioned the efficacy of Bono's campaign to relieve debt and provide assistance to Africa.

Other projects and collaborations 
The members of U2 have undertaken side projects, sometimes in collaboration with some of their bandmates. In 1985, Bono recorded the song "In a Lifetime" with the Irish band Clannad. The Edge recorded a solo soundtrack album for the film Captive, which was released in 1986 and included a vocal performance by Sinéad O'Connor on the song "Heroine" that predates her own debut album by a year. For Robbie Robertson's 1987 self-titled solo album, U2 performed on the songs "Sweet Fire of Love" and "Testimony". Bono and the Edge wrote the song "She's a Mystery to Me" for Roy Orbison, which was featured on his 1989 album Mystery Girl. In 1990, Bono and the Edge provided the original score to the Royal Shakespeare Company London's stage adaptation of A Clockwork Orange. One track, "Alex Descends into Hell for a Bottle of Milk/Korova 1", was on the B-side to "The Fly" single. That same year, Mullen produced and played drums on "Put 'Em Under Pressure", a song for the Irish national football team for the 1990 FIFA World Cup; the song topped the Irish charts for 13 weeks. For the 1995 James Bond film GoldenEye, Bono and the Edge wrote the title song "GoldenEye", which was performed by Tina Turner. Clayton and Mullen reworked the "Theme from Mission: Impossible" for the franchise's 1996 film. Bono and the Edge ventured into theatre again by writing the music and lyrics for the Broadway musical Spider-Man: Turn Off the Dark, which opened in June 2011. Bono and the Edge collaborated with Dutch DJ Martin Garrix on the 2021 track "We Are the People", which served as the official song of the UEFA Euro 2020 tournament.

In addition to collaborating with fellow musicians, U2 have worked with several authors. American author William S. Burroughs had a guest appearance in U2's video for "Last Night on Earth" shortly before he died. Video footage of him reading his poem "Thanksgiving Prayer" was used during a Zoo TV Tour television special. Other collaborators include Allen Ginsberg and Salman Rushdie. Lyrics from Rushdie's 1999 book The Ground Beneath Her Feet were adapted by U2 into the song "The Ground Beneath Her Feet", which was one of three tracks the group contributed to The Million Dollar Hotel movie soundtrack in 2000.

In April 2017, U2 were featured on a Kendrick Lamar song, "XXX", from his album DAMN.

Legacy 

U2 have sold an estimated 150–170 million records worldwide, placing them among the best-selling music artists in history. The group's fifth studio album, The Joshua Tree, is one of the best-selling albums in the US (10 million copies shipped) and worldwide (25 million copies sold). With 52 million certified units by the RIAA, U2 rank as the 22nd-highest-selling music artist in the US. U2 have eight albums that have reached number one in the US, the third-most of any group. They were the first group to attain number-one albums in the US in the 1980s, 1990s, 2000s, and 2010s. In the UK, the group have had seven number-one singles, tied for the 17th-most of any artist, and ten number-one albums, tied for the 8th-most of any artist. The band's 1,465 weeks spent on the UK music charts ranks 17th all-time. In their native Ireland, U2 hold the record for most number-one singles with 19.

In the 1980s, U2 "dominated the alternative rock scene", according to cultural critic Kevin J. H. Dettmar. Similarly, in the next decade, they were one of the most famous alternative rock bands worldwide and among the highest-selling rock bands. Record sales declined in the 2000s and the music industry entered an age of often illegal digital downloading, but according to author Mat Snow, U2 prospered more than younger acts because of a loyal following that held an attachment to the album format. Snow said, "Children of the album era as they were, U2 would never stop regarding the album as the core statement of their creativity", despite progressively decreasing sales, while he noted that live shows consequently became the group's greatest source of revenue.

According to Billboard Boxscore, the band grossed US$1.67 billion in ticket sales from 1990 to 2016, second only to the Rolling Stones. U2 were the only group in the top 25 touring acts from 2000 to 2009 to sell out every show they played. According to Pollstar, the band grossed $1.038 billion and sold 9,300,500 tickets from 255 shows played between 2010 and November 2019, earning the publication's title of touring artist of the 2010s decade; U2 were the only artist to surpass $1 billion grossed during that span. Forbes has named U2 the world's annual highest-earning music artist a record five times. The Sunday Times 2020 Irish Rich List estimated the group's collective wealth at €670 million.

U2 are regarded as one of the greatest pop-rock acts of all time. Rolling Stone placed U2 at number 22 on its list of "The 100 Greatest Artists of All Time", while ranking Bono the 32nd-greatest singer, the Edge the 38th-greatest guitarist, and Mullen the 96th-greatest drummer. The magazine placed Bono and the Edge at number 35 on its list of the "100 Greatest Songwriters of All Time". In 2004, Q ranked U2 as the fourth-biggest band in a list compiled based on album sales, time spent on the UK charts, and largest audience for a headlining show. VH1 placed U2 at number 19 on its 2010 list of "The 100 Greatest Artists of All Time". In 2010, eight of U2's songs appeared on Rolling Stones updated list of "The 500 Greatest Songs of All Time", with "One" ranking the highest at number 36. Five of the group's twelve studio albums were ranked on the magazine's 2012 list of "The 500 Greatest Albums of All Time"—The Joshua Tree placed the highest at number 27. Reflecting on the band's popularity and worldwide impact, Jeff Pollack for The Huffington Post said, "like The Who before them, U2 wrote songs about things that were important and resonated with their audience". Houston Press journalist John Seaborn Gray attributed U2's pioneering impact on pop-rock music largely to the Edge's unique guitar style.

U2 received their first Grammy Award in 1988 for The Joshua Tree, and they have won 22 in total out of 46 nominations, more than any other group. These include Best Rock Performance by a Duo or Group, Album of the Year, Record of the Year, Song of the Year, and Best Rock Album. In the UK, U2 have received 7 Brit Awards out of 20 nominations from the British Phonographic Industry, including five wins for Best International Group. They were the first international group to win the Brit Award for Outstanding Contribution to Music. In Ireland, U2 have won 14 Meteor Awards since the awards began in 2001. Other awards won by the band and their members include one American Music Award, six MTV Video Music Awards, eleven Q Awards, two Juno Awards, five NME Awards, and two Golden Globe Awards. The band were inducted into the Rock and Roll Hall of Fame in March 2005. In 2006, all four members of the band received ASCAP awards for writing the songs "I Still Haven't Found What I'm Looking For" and "Vertigo". In 2022, the group received Kennedy Center Honors for their contributions in the performing arts, making them only the fifth musical group to be so honoured.

Band members 

Current members
 Bono (Paul Hewson) – lead vocals, rhythm guitar, harmonica (1976–present)
 The Edge (David Evans) – lead guitar, keyboards, backing vocals (1976–present)
 Adam Clayton – bass guitar (1976–present)
 Larry Mullen Jr. – drums, percussion (1976–present)

Current touring musicians
 Terry Lawless – keyboards (2001–present)
 Bram van den Berg – drums, percussion (2023–present)

Former members
 Dik Evans – guitar (1976–1978)
 Ivan McCormick – guitar (1976)

Discography 

 Boy (1980)
 October (1981)
 War (1983)
 The Unforgettable Fire (1984)
 The Joshua Tree (1987)
 Rattle and Hum (1988) 
 Achtung Baby (1991)
 Zooropa (1993)
 Pop (1997)
 All That You Can't Leave Behind (2000)
 How to Dismantle an Atomic Bomb (2004)
 No Line on the Horizon (2009)
 Songs of Innocence (2014)
 Songs of Experience (2017)
 Songs of Surrender (2023)

Live performances

Concert tours
 U2-3 Tour (1979–1980)
 11 O'Clock Tick Tock Tour (1980)
 Boy Tour (1980–1981)
 October Tour (1981–1982)
 War Tour (1982–1983)
 The Unforgettable Fire Tour (1984–1985)
 The Joshua Tree Tour (1987)
 Lovetown Tour (1989–1990)
 Zoo TV Tour (1992–1993)
 PopMart Tour (1997–1998)
 Elevation Tour (2001)
 Vertigo Tour (2005–2006)
 U2 360° Tour (2009–2011)
 Innocence + Experience Tour (2015)
 The Joshua Tree Tour 2017 (2017)
 Experience + Innocence Tour (2018)
 The Joshua Tree Tour 2019 (2019)

Concert residencies
U2:UV Achtung Baby Live at the Sphere (2023)

References

Citations

General and cited references

External links 

 
 

 

 
1976 establishments in Ireland
Brit Award winners
CBS Records artists
Grammy Award winners
Interscope Records artists
Irish alternative rock groups
Irish pop rock music groups
Irish post-punk music groups
Island Records artists
Ivor Novello Award winners
Juno Award for International Entertainer of the Year winners
U2
MTV Europe Music Award winners
Musical groups established in 1976
Musical groups from Dublin (city)
Musical quartets
Postmodern musicians
Sports Emmy Award winners
World Music Awards winners
Kennedy Center honorees